Marina Daloca (born 8 September 1979) is a Brazilian female volleyball player, who played as a middle blocker.

She was part of the Brazil women's national volleyball team at the 2002 FIVB Volleyball Women's World Championship in Germany.

On club level she played with Minas Tênis Clube.

Clubs

References

External links 
 player info FIVB

1979 births
Living people
Brazilian women's volleyball players
Place of birth missing (living people)
Middle blockers